Metaxia duplicarinata is a species of marine gastropod mollusc in the family Triphoridae. It was first described by Baden Powell in 1940, under the name Mendax duplicarinata. It is endemic to the waters of New Zealand.

Description
Metaxia duplicarinata has a uniformly glossy white conical shell. The nuclear whorls are slightly angular. The species measures 4mm in height.

It differs from Metaxia maoria by having four instead of five spirals per whorl.

Distribution
The species is Endemic to New Zealand, around Manawatāwhi / Three Kings Islands and the Bay of Islands.

References

Triphoridae
Gastropods described in 1940
Gastropods of New Zealand
Endemic fauna of New Zealand
Endemic molluscs of New Zealand
Molluscs of the Pacific Ocean
Taxa named by Arthur William Baden Powell